Rotten Tomatoes is an American review-aggregation website for film and television. The company was launched in August 1998 by three undergraduate students at the University of California, Berkeley: Senh Duong, Patrick Y. Lee, and Stephen Wang. Although the name "Rotten Tomatoes" connects to the practice of audiences throwing rotten tomatoes in disapproval of a poor stage performance, the original inspiration comes from a scene featuring tomatoes in the Canadian film Léolo (1992).

Since January 2010, Rotten Tomatoes has been owned by Flixster, which was in turn acquired by Warner Bros in 2011. In February 2016, Rotten Tomatoes and its parent site Flixster were sold to Comcast's Fandango. Warner Bros. retained a minority stake in the merged entities, including Fandango.

History

Rotten Tomatoes was launched on August 12, 1998, as a spare-time project by Senh Duong. His objective in creating Rotten Tomatoes was "to create a site where people can get access to reviews from a variety of critics in the U.S". As a fan of Jackie Chan, Duong was inspired to create the website after collecting all the reviews of Chan's Hong Kong action movies as they were being released in the United States. The catalyst for the creation of the website was Rush Hour (1998), Chan's first major Hollywood crossover, which was originally planned to release in August 1998. Duong coded the website in two weeks and the site went live the same month, but the release of Rush Hour was delayed until September 1998. Besides Jackie Chan films, he began including other films on Rotten Tomatoes, extending it beyond Chan's fandom. The first non-Chan Hollywood movie whose reviews were featured on Rotten Tomatoes was Your Friends & Neighbors (1998). The website was an immediate success, receiving mentions by Netscape, Yahoo!, and USA Today within the first week of its launch; it attracted "600–1,000 daily unique visitors" as a result.

Duong teamed up with University of California, Berkeley classmates Patrick Y. Lee and Stephen Wang, his former partners at the Berkeley, California-based web design firm Design Reactor, to pursue Rotten Tomatoes on a full-time basis. They officially launched it on April 1, 2000.

In June 2004, IGN Entertainment acquired Rotten Tomatoes for an undisclosed sum. In September 2005, IGN was bought by News Corp's Fox Interactive Media. In January 2010, IGN sold the website to Flixster. The combined reach of both companies is 30 million unique visitors a month across all different platforms, according to the companies. In 2011, Warner Bros. acquired Rotten Tomatoes.

In early 2009, Current Television launched The Rotten Tomatoes Show, a televised version of the web review site. It was hosted by Brett Erlich and Ellen Fox and written by Mark Ganek. The show aired Thursdays at 10:30 EST until September 16, 2010. It returned as a much shorter segment of InfoMania, a satirical news show that ended in 2011.

By late 2009, the website was designed to enable Rotten Tomatoes users to create and join groups to discuss various aspects of film. One group, "The Golden Oyster Awards", accepted votes of members for various awards, spoofing the better-known Academy Awards or Golden Globes. When Flixster bought the company, they disbanded the groups.

As of February 2011, new community features have been added and others removed. For example, users can no longer sort films by Fresh Ratings from Rotten Ratings, and vice versa.

On September 17, 2013, a section devoted to scripted television series, called TV Zone, was created as a subsection of the website.

In February 2016, Rotten Tomatoes and its parent site Flixster were sold to Comcast's Fandango Media. Warner Bros retained a minority stake in the merged entities, including Fandango.

In December 2016, Fandango and all its various websites moved to Fox Interactive Media's former headquarters in Beverly Hills, California.

In July 2017, the website's editor-in-chief since 2007, Matt Atchity, left to join The Young Turks YouTube channel.  On November 1, 2017, the site launched a new web series on Facebook, See It/Skip It, hosted by Jacqueline Coley and Segun Oduolowu.

In March 2018, the site announced its new design, icons and logo for the first time in 19 years at South by Southwest.

In February 2021, the Rotten Tomatoes staff made an entry on their Product Blog, announcing several design changes to the site:  Each film's 'Score Box' at the top of the page would now also include its release year, genre, and runtimes, with an MPAA rating to be soon added; the number of ratings would be shown in groupings – from 50+ up to 250,000+ ratings, for easier visualization.  Links to critics and viewers are included underneath the ratings.  By clicking on either the Tomatometer Score or the Audience Score, the users can access "Score Details" information, such as the number of Fresh and Rotten reviews, average rating, and Top Critics’ score. The team also added a new "What to Know" section for each film entry page, which could combine the "Critics Consensus" blurb with a new "Audience Says" blurb, so users can see an at-a-glance summary of the sentiments of both certified critics and verified audience members.

As of April 11, 2022, Rotten Tomatoes is a top 1000 site, being the 593rd highest-ranked website in the world, and #254 in the United States, according to website ranker Alexa.

Features

Critics' aggregate score
Rotten Tomatoes staff first collect online reviews from writers who are certified members of various writing guilds or film critic-associations. To be accepted as a critic on the website, a critic's original reviews must garner a specific number of "likes" from users. Those classified as "Top Critics" generally write for major newspapers. The critics upload their reviews to the movie page on the website, and need to mark their review "fresh" if it's generally favorable or "rotten" otherwise. It is necessary for the critic to do so as some reviews are qualitative and do not grant a numeric score, making it impossible for the system to be automatic.

The website keeps track of all the reviews counted for each film and calculates the percentage of positive reviews. Major recently released films can attract more than 400 reviews. If the positive reviews make up 60% or more, the film is considered "fresh". If the positive reviews are less than 60%, the film is considered "rotten". An average score on a 0 to 10 scale is also calculated. With each review, a short excerpt of the review is quoted that also serves a hyperlink to the complete review essay for anyone interested to read the critic's full thoughts on the subject.

"Top Critics", such as Roger Ebert, Desson Thomson, Stephen Hunter, Owen Gleiberman, Lisa Schwarzbaum, Peter Travers and Michael Phillips are identified in a sub-listing that calculates their reviews separately. Their opinions are also included in the general rating. When there are sufficient reviews, the staff creates and posts a consensus statement to express the general reasons for the collective opinion of the film.

This rating is indicated by an equivalent icon at the film listing, to give the reader a one-glance look at the general critical opinion about the work. The "Certified Fresh" seal is reserved for movies that satisfy two criteria: a "Tomatometer" of 75% or better and at least 80 reviews (40 for limited release movies) from "Tomatometer" critics (including 5 Top Critics). Films earning this status will keep it unless the positive critical percentage drops below 70%. Films with 100% positive ratings that lack the required number of reviews may not receive the "Certified Fresh" seal.

Tomatometer Rankings 

When a film or TV show reaches the requirements for the "Certified Fresh", it is not automatically granted the seal, but is instead flagged for the staff's consideration. Once the team assesses the reviews and response to the film or TV show, and decide that it is unlikely that the score will fall below the minimum requirements in the future, they will then mark it as "Certified Fresh".

Golden Tomato Awards
In 2000, Rotten Tomatoes announced the RT Awards honoring the best-reviewed films of the year according to the website's rating system. The awards were later renamed the Golden Tomato Awards. The nominees and winners are announced on the website, although there is no actual awards ceremony.

The films are divided into wide release and limited release categories. Limited releases are defined as opening in 599 or fewer theaters at initial release. Platform releases, movies initially released under 600 theaters but later receiving wider distribution, fall under this definition. Any film opening in more than 600 theaters is considered wide release. There are also two categories purely for British and Australian films. The "User"-category represents the highest rated film among users, and the "Mouldy"-award represents the worst-reviewed films of the year. A movie must have 40 (originally 20) or more rated reviews to be considered for domestic categories. It must have 500 or more user ratings to be considered for the "User"-category.

Films are further classified based on film genre. Each movie is eligible in only one genre, aside from non-English-language films, which can be included in both their genre and the respective "Foreign" category.

Once a film is considered eligible, its "votes" are counted. Each critic from the website's list gets one vote (as determined by their review), all weighted equally. Because reviews are continually added, manually and otherwise, a cutoff date at which new reviews are not counted toward the Golden Tomato awards is initiated each year, usually the first of the new year. Reviews without ratings are not counted toward the results of the Golden Tomato Awards.

Audience score and reviews

Each movie features a "user average", which calculates the percentage of registered users who have rated the film positively on a 5-star scale, similar to calculation of recognized critics' reviews.

On May 24, 2019, Rotten Tomatoes introduced a verified rating system that would replace the earlier system where users were merely required to register in order to submit a rating. Henceforth, in addition to creating an account, users will have to verify their ticket purchase through Fandango Media, a ticketing company which Rotten Tomatoes is a subsidiary of. While users can still leave reviews without verifying, those reviews will not account for the average audience score displayed next to the Tomatometer.

"What to Know"

In February 2021, a new "What to Know" section was created for each film entry, combining the "Critics Consensus" and a new "Audience Says" blurbs within it, to give users an at-a-glance summary of the general sentiments of a film as experienced by critics and audiences.  Prior to February 2021, only the "Critics Consensus" blurb was posted for each entry, after enough certified critics had submitted reviews.  When the "Audience Says" blurbs were added, Rotten Tomatoes initially included them only for newer films and those with a significant audience rating, but suggested that they may later add them for older films as well.

"Critics Consensus" / "Audience Says" 
Each movie features a brief blurb summary of the critics' reviews, called the "Critical Consensus", used in that entry's Tomatometer aggregate score. These are written by Jeff Giles, a longtime author for the site.

In February 2021, Rotten Tomatoes added an "Audience Says" section; similar to the "Critics Consensus", it summarizes the reviews noted by registered users into a concise blurb. In a blog memo, the Rotten Tomatoes staff noted that for any given film, if there were any external factors such as controversies or issues affecting the sentiments of a film, they may address it in the "Audience Says" section in order to give users the most relevant info regarding their viewing choices.

Localized versions
Localized versions of the site available in the United Kingdom, India, and Australia were discontinued following the acquisition of Rotten Tomatoes by Fandango. The Mexican version of the site, remains active.

API
The Rotten Tomatoes API provides limited access to critic and audience ratings and reviews, allowing developers to incorporate Rotten Tomatoes data on other websites. The free service is intended for use in the US only; permission is required for use elsewhere. As of 2022, API access is restricted to approved developers that must go through an application process.

Influence
Major Hollywood studios have come to see Rotten Tomatoes as a threat to their marketing. In 2017, several blockbuster films like Pirates of the Caribbean: Dead Men Tell No Tales, Baywatch and The Mummy were projected to open with gross receipts of $90 million, $50 million and $45 million, respectively, but ended up debuting with $62.6 million, $23.1 million and $31.6 million. Rotten Tomatoes, which scored the films at 30%, 19% and 16%, respectively, was blamed for undermining them. That same summer, films like Wonder Woman and Spider-Man: Homecoming (both 92%) received high scores and opened at or exceeded expectations with their $100+ million trackings.

As result of this concern, 20th Century Fox commissioned a 2015 study, titled "Rotten Tomatoes and Box Office", that stated the website combined with social media was going to be an increasingly serious complication for the film business: "The power of Rotten Tomatoes and fast-breaking word of mouth will only get stronger. Many Millennials and even Gen X-ers now vet every purchase through the Internet, whether it's restaurants, video games, make-up, consumer electronics or movies. As they get older and comprise an even larger share of total moviegoers, this behavior is unlikely to change". Other studios have commissioned a number of studies on the subject, with them finding that seven out of 10 people said they would be less interested in seeing a film if the Rotten Tomatoes score was 0–25, and that the site has the most influence on people 25 and younger.

The scores have reached a level of online ubiquity which film companies have found threatening.  For instance, the scores are regularly posted in Google search results for films so reviewed. Furthermore, the scores are prominently featured in Fandango's popular ticket purchasing website and its mobile app, Flixster, which led to complaints that "rotten" scores damaged films' performances.

Others have argued that filmmakers and studios have only themselves to blame if Rotten Tomatoes produces a bad score, as this only reflects a poor reception among film critics. As one independent film distributor marketing executive noted, "To me, it's a ridiculous argument that Rotten Tomatoes is the problem ... make a good movie!". ComScore's Paul Dergarabedian had similar comments, saying: "The best way for studios to combat the 'Rotten Tomatoes Effect' is to make better movies, plain and simple".

Some studios have suggested embargoing or cancelling early critic screenings in a response to poor reviews prior to a film's release affecting pre-sales and opening weekend numbers. In July 2017, Sony embargoed critic reviews for The Emoji Movie until mid-day the Thursday before its release. The film ended up with a 9% rating (including 0% after the first 25 reviews), but still opened to $24 million, on par with projections. Josh Greenstein, Sony Pictures President of Worldwide Marketing and Distribution, said: "The Emoji Movie was built for people under 18 ... so we wanted to give the movie its best chance. What other wide release with a score under 8 percent has opened north of $20 million? I don't think there is one". Conversely, Warner Bros. also did not do critic pre-screenings for The House, which ended up with a 16% rating, until the day of its release, but it still opened to just $8.7 million, the lowest of star Will Ferrell's career.

That marketing tactic can backfire, and drew the vocal disgust of influential critics such as Roger Ebert, who was prone to derisively condemn such moves, with gestures such as "The Wagging Finger of Shame", on At the Movies. Furthermore, the very nature of withholding reviews can draw early conclusions from the public that the film is of poor quality because of that marketing tactic.

On February 26, 2019, in response to issues surrounding coordinated "bombing" of user reviews for several films, most notably Captain Marvel and Star Wars: The Rise of Skywalker, prior to their release, the site announced that user reviews would no longer be accepted until a film is publicly released. The site also announced plans to introduce a system for "verified" reviews, and that the "Want to See" statistic would now be expressed as a number so that it would not be confused with the audience score.

Despite arguments on how Rotten Tomatoes scores impact the box office, academic researchers so far have not found evidence that Rotten Tomatoes ratings affect box office performance.

Reception
Rotten Tomatoes won the 2020 Webby People's Voice Award for Entertainment in the Web category.

Oversimplification
In January 2010, on the occasion of the 75th anniversary of the New York Film Critics Circle, its chairman Armond White cited Rotten Tomatoes in particular and film review aggregators in general as examples of how "the Internet takes revenge on individual expression". He said they work by "dumping reviewers onto one website and assigning spurious percentage-enthusiasm points to the discrete reviews". According to White, such websites "offer consensus as a substitute for assessment".

Director and producer Brett Ratner has criticized the website for "reducing hundreds of reviews culled from print and online sources into a popularized aggregate score", while expressing respect for traditional film critics. Writer Max Landis, following his film Victor Frankenstein receiving an approval rating of 24% on the site, wrote that the site "breaks down entire reviews into just the word 'yes' or 'no', making criticism binary in a destructive arbitrary way".

Other criticisms
American director Martin Scorsese wrote a column in The Hollywood Reporter criticizing both Rotten Tomatoes and CinemaScore for promoting the idea that films like Mother! had to be "instantly liked" to be successful.

In 2015, while promoting the film Suffragette (which has a 73% approval rating) actress Meryl Streep accused Rotten Tomatoes of disproportionately representing the opinions of male film critics, resulting in a skewed ratio that adversely affected the commercial performances of female-driven films. "I submit to you that men and women are not the same, they like different things", she said. "Sometimes they like the same thing, but sometimes their tastes diverge. If the Tomatometer is slighted so completely to one set of tastes that drives box office in the United States, absolutely." Critics took issue with the sentiment that someone's gender or ethnic background would dictate their response to art.

Rotten Tomatoes deliberately withheld the critic score for Justice League based on early reviews until the premiere of its See It/Skip It episode on the Thursday before its release. Some critics viewed the move as a ploy to promote the web series, but some argued that the move was a deliberate conflict of interest on account of Warner Bros.' ownership of the film and Rotten Tomatoes, and the tepid critical reception of the DC Extended Universe films at the time.

See also

 Metacritic
 Internet Movie Database (IMDb)
 List of films with a 0% rating on Rotten Tomatoes
 List of films with a 100% rating on Rotten Tomatoes
 "Splatty Tomato"

References

Further reading

External links
 

American film review websites
Recommender systems
Online film databases
Internet properties established in 1998
Fandango
Former News Corporation subsidiaries
Television websites